Sarılar, formerly and still informally called Kaleobası, is a village in the Şehitkamil District, Gaziantep Province, Turkey. The village is inhabited by Turkmens of the Jerid tribe and had a population of 350 in 2021.

References

Villages in Şehitkamil District